The Blackall-Tambo Region is a local government area in Central West Queensland, Australia. Established in 2008, it was preceded by two previous local government areas dating from the 1870s.

For the financial year 2010/11 it had an approximate operating budget of A$30m.

History 
Kuungkari (also known as Kungkari and Koonkerri) is a language of Western Queensland. The Kuungkari language region includes the landscape within the local government boundaries of Longreach Shire Council and Blackall-Tambo Shire Council.

Prior to the 2008 amalgamation, the Blackall-Tambo Region existed as two distinct local government areas:

 the Shire of Blackall;
 and the Shire of Tambo.

The entire Region was originally part of Kargoolnah Division, which was created on 11 November 1879 as one of 74 divisions around Queensland under the Divisional Boards Act 1879. On 20 May 1880, a municipal Borough of Blackall was created to cover the town and its first councillors were elected in July 1880. On 1 January 1881, a new Tambo Division was proclaimed and excised from Kargoolnah.

With the passage of the Local Authorities Act 1902, Kargoolnah became a Shire on 31 March 1903, while Blackall became a Town. The latter was abolished on 7 November 1931 and became Division 3 of the Kargoolnah Shire, which had in the meantime shrunk to include only the Blackall region. On 19 November 1932, after representations to the State Government, Kargoolnah was officially renamed Blackall.

In July 2007, the Local Government Reform Commission released its report and recommended that the two areas amalgamate. Both councils opposed the amalgamation. On 15 March 2008, the two Shires formally ceased to exist, and elections were held on the same day to elect councillors and a mayor to the Regional Council.

Wards
The Region has four divisions, each of whom elects one councillor, and a mayor is directly elected for the entire region.

Mayors 
 2008–2012: Jan Ross
 2012–2016: Barry Muir
 2016–present: Andrew Linedale Martin

Towns and localities 
The Blackall-Tambo Region includes the following settlements:

Blackall area:
 Blackall
 Alice Downs
 Malvern Hills
 Northhampton Downs
 Terrick Terrick
 Yalleroi (ghost town)

Tambo area:
 Tambo
 Bayrick
 Caldervale
 Landsdowne
 Lumeah
 Macfarlane
 Minnie Downs
 Mount Enniskillen
 Scrubby Creek
 Windeyer
 Yandarlo

Amenities 
Blackall-Tambo Regional Council operate public libraries at Blackall and Tambo.

Population
The populations given relate to the component entities prior to 2008.

References

External links
 University of Queensland: Queensland Places: Blackall-Tambo Regional Council

 
Blackall-Tambo
2008 establishments in Australia